Vaughn may refer to:

Places in the United States
Vaughn, California, former name of Bodfish, California
Vaughn, Montana
Vaughn, New Mexico
Vaughn, Oregon
Vaughn, Pennsylvania
Vaughn, Virginia
Vaughn, Washington

Name
Vaughn (surname), list of notable people with the surname
Vaughn Bodē (1941–1975), underground comics writer
Vaughn Duggins (born 1987), American basketball player
Vaughn Flora (1945–2022), American politician
Vaughn Meader (1936–2004), American comedian and impressionist
Vaughn Monroe (1911–1973), American singer
Vaughn Taylor (1910–1983), American movie and TV actor
Vaughn Taylor (born 1976), American golf-player
Vaughn van Jaarsveld (born 1985), South African cricketer
Vaughn Walker (born 1944), federal judge

Other
Vaughn College of Aeronautics and Technology, New York
Vaughn (band), hard rock band
Vaughn Hockey, sports equipment maker

See also 
Vaughan (disambiguation)
Vaughan (surname)
Vaughan (given name)
 Justice Vaughn (disambiguation)
 Vagn, a given name
 Von (disambiguation)